Hippopodius is a genus of cnidarians belonging to the family Hippopodiidae.

The genus has cosmopolitan distribution.

This genus now contains only a single species, Hippopodius hippopus, although historically it contained more:
 Hippopodius cuspitatus Moser, 1925 accepted as Nectopyramis natans (Bigelow, 1911) 
 Hippopodius glabrus (Bigelow, 1918) accepted as Vogtia glabra Bigelow, 1918 
 Hippopodius gleba Leuckart, 1854 accepted as Hippopodius hippopus (Forsskål, 1776) 
Hippopodius luteus Quoy & Gaimard, 1827 accepted as Hippopodius hippopus (Forsskål, 1776)  
Hippopodius mediterraneus Costa, 1836 accepted as Hippopodius hippopus (Forsskål, 1776) 
Hippopodius neapolitanus Kölliker, 1853 accepted as Hippopodius hippopus (Forsskål, 1776) 
Hippopodius pentacanthus (Kölliker, 1853) accepted as Vogtia pentacantha Kölliker, 1853  
Hippopodius serratus Moser, 1915 accepted as Vogtia serrata (Moser, 1915) 
Hippopodius spinosus (Keferstein & Ehlers, 1861) accepted as Vogtia spinosa Keferstein & Ehlers, 1861 
Hippopodius ungulatus (Haeckel, 1888) accepted as Hippopodius hippopus (Forsskål, 1776)

References

Hippopodiidae
Hydrozoan genera